The 1989 NCAA Division I women's volleyball tournament began with 32 teams and ended on December 16, 1989, when Long Beach State defeated Nebraska 3 games to 0 in the NCAA championship match.

Led by AVCA co-National Player of the Year Tara Cross's 20 kills, Long Beach State defeated Nebraska 15-12, 15-0, 15-6 to win the school's first NCAA championship. Nebraska made the program's second championship match appearance.

The 1989 Final Four was held at the Neil S. Blaisdell Center in Honolulu, Hawaii.

Records
{|
| valign=top |

Brackets

Northwest regional

South regional

Mideast regional

West regional

Final Four - Neil S. Blaisdell Center, Honolulu, Hawaii

NCAA tournament records

There are 4 NCAA tournaments record that were set in the 1989 NCAA tournament that still stand today.

Total kill attempts, match (individual record) - Teee Williams, Hawaii - 99 vs. Cal Poly
Total kills, match (team record) - 112 - UCSB vs. Cal Poly
Total kill attempts, match (team record) - 328 - UCSB vs. Cal Poly
Digs, match (team record) - 177 -  UCSB vs. Cal Poly

See also
NCAA Women's Volleyball Championship

References

NCAA Women's Volleyball Championship
NCAA
Sports competitions in Hawaii
1989 in American sports
1989 in sports in Hawaii
Volleyball in Hawaii
December 1989 sports events in the United States
Sports competitions in Honolulu